The Tanzania Zanzibar International Register of Shipping (TZIRS) is the body appointed by the Tanzania Zanzibar Government to register ships under the Tanzanian flag.

References

External links
Tanzania Zanzibar International Register of Shipping Official Website.

Transport in Tanzania
Economy of Tanzania
Ship registration